Galaktion and Episteme
Galaktion Tabidze
Galaktion Alpaidze